Dan Alterman (born April 27, 1980) is an Israeli triathlete who - in association with his identical twin brother Ran - dominated Israeli triathlons between 2001 and 2012. He has competed at an international level since 2001.

Career highlights
 Israeli Champion 2001
 Israeli Champion 2003
 Israeli Champion 2004
 Israeli Champion 2005
 Israeli Champion 2010
 Israeli Champion 2011

Sources
Profile

1980 births
Living people
20th-century Israeli Jews
21st-century Israeli Jews
Israeli male triathletes
Identical twins
Israeli twins
Twin sportspeople
Jewish Israeli sportspeople